The La Habra City Elementary School District is located in the northwestern part of Orange County, California, United States and covers a five-mile area that includes the city of La Habra and parts of La Habra Heights, Brea and Fullerton. The district serves approximately 4,700 students, with seven elementary schools for students in transitional kindergarten (T-K) through sixth grade and two middle schools for grades six through eight.

The Middle School Academies provide students in grades six through eight, with a Comprehensive academic program, which recognizes the special needs and characteristics of this age group. The Academy of the Arts emphasizes the integration of the Arts into the core academic program and has expanded elective offerings in the creative and performing Arts. The Science and Technology Academy focuses on elective courses that integrate Science, Technology, Engineering, Art, and Mathematics. Upon completion of eighth grade, students attend either La Habra High School or Sonora High School. These high schools are part of the Fullerton Joint Union High School District. Students may also take an assessment to get into Troy High School in Fullerton, also part of the Fullerton High School District.

References

External links 
 

School districts in Orange County, California
School districts established in 1896
1896 establishments in California